Sekhmet is an Egyptian goddess. 

Sekhmet may also refer to:

 5381 Sekhmet, an asteroid
 Sekhmet (Re:Zero), a character in the light novel series Re:Zero − Starting Life in Another World 
 Sekhmet (Ronin Warriors), a character from the Japanese anime series
 Sekhmet (Marvel Comics)
 A Vasudan heavy bomber in the game Freespace 2